Filatovskaya is a rural locality (a village) in Beketovskoye Rural Settlement, Vozhegodsky District, Vologda Oblast, Russia. The population was 15 as of 2002.

Geography 
Filatovskaya is located 78 km southwest of Vozhega (the district's administrative centre) by road. Kuritsino is the nearest rural locality.

References 

Rural localities in Vozhegodsky District